Bonne Terre Depot, also known as the Mississippi River and Bonne Terre Railway Depot, is a historic train station located at Bonne Terre, St. Francois County, Missouri.  It was built in 1909 by the Mississippi River and Bonne Terre Railway, and is a 2 1/2-story, Queen Anne / Stick style frame building on an ashlar foundation.  It has a hipped roof with dormers and features a round, conical-roofed tower and encircling verandah with bell-cast profile. The building has been renovated as a bed and breakfast inn.

It was added to the National Register of Historic Places in 1984.

References

External links

Bonne Terre Depot

Former Missouri Pacific Railroad stations
Bed and breakfasts in Missouri
Railway stations on the National Register of Historic Places in Missouri
Queen Anne architecture in Missouri
Railway stations in the United States opened in 1909
National Register of Historic Places in St. Francois County, Missouri
Former railway stations in Missouri